A referendum on legalizing casino gambling was held in the United States Virgin Islands in November 1994, alongside general elections. It was a repeat of the 1992 referendum, which saw the proposal rejected by a narrow margin. This time the proposal was rejected in St Thomas and St John but approved in St Croix.

Results

St Thomas/St John

St Croix

Aftermath
Following the referendum, the Legislature voted to legalized casino gambling in St Croix by a vote of 9–6 on 27 April 1995. Governor Roy Schneider signed the bill into law on 8 May.

References

1994 referendums
1994 in the United States Virgin Islands
Referendums in the United States Virgin Islands
Gambling referendums